Elections to Mole Valley Council were held on 1 May 2003. One third of the council was up for election and the council stayed under no overall control.

After the election, the composition of the council was:
Conservative 19
Liberal Democrat 15
Independent 6
Labour 1

Election result

Ward results

References
2003 Mole Valley election result
Ward results

2003
2003 English local elections
2000s in Surrey